Garuzeh (also Romanized as Garūzeh) is a village in Sadat Mahmudi Rural District, Pataveh District, Dana County, Kohgiluyeh and Boyer-Ahmad Province, Iran. At the 2006 census, its population was 20, in 4 families.

References 

Populated places in Dana County